Katarzyna "Kasia" Monika Babis (born 20 December 1992) is a Polish author of comic books, cartoonist, illustrator, painter, author of children's books, YouTuber and political activist.

Career
She has published webcomics in Polish on her blog Kącik Kiciputka since 2012 and in English at Kittypat Daily since 2016, initially using the pseudonyms "Kiciputek" and "Kittypat". Her debut in print was the 2014 comic book Tequila, written by Łukasz Śmigiel, notable for being one of the first successfully crowdfunded Polish comics. In the same year, the first issue of the Rag & Bones comic was published, written by Dominik Szcześniak. She has illustrated books by Katarzyna Berenika Miszczuk and Marta Kisiel-Małecka. She has also illustrated a My Little Pony: Friendship Is Magic tie-in book.

She debuted as a prose writer with the children's book Maja z Księżyca which she also illustrated, and which was nominated to the City of Warsaw Literary Award. Since 2017, she has been publishing English-language comics at The Nib. and in 2019 her cartoon was first published by The New Yorker. Her comics often consist of feminist political satire. Between 2017 and 2019 she worked on art for video games at 11 bit studios.

She contributed art to Guantánamo Voices: True Accounts from the World’s Most Infamous Prison edited by Sarah Mirk, which was named one of the Best Graphic Novels of 2020 by The New York Times, one of the 2021 Great Graphic Novels for Teens by the Young Adult Library Services Association (YALSA), awarded the 2021 Lynd Ward Graphic Novel Prize from the Penn State University Libraries and nominated to the 2021 Eisner Award for Best Anthology.

Since 2019, she worked with Macmillan Publishers illustrating the Re:Constitutions graphic novel written by Beka Feathers. According to Publishers Weekly, "this educational comics guidebook to constitutions takes on a commendable international scope", and "Helped along by Babis’s charming if somewhat overly smiley character drawings, the team goes beyond the basics to tackle more substantial examples (such as how Rwanda’s 2003 constitution required 30% of government decision-making bodies to comprise women) and urgent particulars (“the constitution is only as strong as the people who use it”)."

Politics
In 2015 she joined the newly founded left-wing political party Razem. She ran in the 2015 Polish parliamentary election on Razem's Lublin candidate list. She received 631 votes. In May 2016 she was elected to Razem's National Council. In September 2016, she organized demonstrations in Lublin against the proposed legislation to ban abortion in Poland, as part of the nationwide Black Protest movement.
She left the party in 2018.

References

External links
 

1992 births
Living people
The New Yorker cartoonists
Polish comics artists
Polish female comics artists
Polish webcomic creators
Polish children's writers
Polish women children's writers
Polish children's book illustrators
Polish illustrators
Polish women illustrators
Left Together politicians
Polish satirists
Polish socialist feminists
Video game artists
Polish YouTubers